Dichomeris memnonia is a moth in the family Gelechiidae. It was described by Edward Meyrick in 1913. It is found in Rio de Janeiro, Brazil.

The forewings are dark ashy purplish fuscous with bronzy-blackish markings, as well as an oblique transverse bar in the disc at one-fourth, not reaching the margins. There is also a broad cloudy transverse median fascia and a moderately broad fascia from four-fifths of the costa to the tornus. There is also a narrow terminal fascia. The hindwings are dark fuscous.

References

Moths described in 1913
memnonia